Pullur is a small town located in Hosdurg of Kasaragod district, Kerala.

It is situated 10 km away from sub-district headquarter Kanhangad and 30 km away from district headquarter Kasaragod. As per 2009 stats, Pullurperiya is the gram panchayat of Pullur village.

The total geographical area of village is 2859 hectares. Pullur has a total population of 15,565 peoples. There are about 3,667 houses in Pullur village. As per 2019 stats, Pullur villages comes under Uduma assembly & Kasaragod parliamentary constituency. Kanhangad is nearest town to Pullur which is approximately 10 km away.

Places of worship
 Kodavalam Sree Mahavishnu Temple
 Pullur Sree Mahavishnu Temple
 Vishnu mangalam Sree Mahavishnu Temple 
 Altharakkal Sree Muthappan Madapura
Thalikkundu Sri Vishnu Chamundeshwari Temple

Institutions
Govt UP School Pullur
Unhs Pullur
Govt ITI Pullur
Laxmi Meghan College of Nursing

Location
Pullur is located between Periya and Kanhangad on National Highway 66.  The town has grown in prominence because of a large number of new organisations being established there.

References

Villages in Kasaragod district